The Hollywood Candy Company, or Hollywood Brands, was an American confectionery company formed in Hollywood, Carver County, Minnesota, in 1912 by Frank Martoccio.

History
Martoccio, head of the F.A. Martoccio Macaroni Company, acquired a defunct candy factory in 1911 for the sole purpose of replacing one of his own factory's machines that had burned out. Martoccio was talked into buying the entire Pratt and Langhoft Candy plant and found himself in the confectionery business. He purchased another candy company, the Pendergast Candy Company of Minneapolis, in 1927, changing the name to Hollywood Brands in 1933.  The Pendergast Company had discovered the method of making a fluffy nougat for candy bars, which was copied by Frank Mars for his Milky Way bars. Martoccio invented a synthetic coating for his candy bars to keep them from melting in warm temperatures. He used only the very best ingredients—real cocoa butter, eggs, etc.-- and was still able to sell his milk chocolate bars for 3 cents compared to the 5 cent Hershey bar (1955). That was not continued after the company was sold in 1967.

Hollywood Candy Company moved to Centralia, Illinois, in 1938. During the 1950s, Hollywood Candy Company owned a Crosley Super Sport, which was painted to look like the Zero candy bar wrapper and employed a midget to impersonate a character called Zero and drive around advertising the candy bar. In 1967, the Martoccio family sold Hollywood Brands to Consolidated Foods, later Sara Lee. The Centralia plant was destroyed in a fire in 1980.

In 1988 Hollywood Brands was acquired by the Leaf Candy Company, then became part of The Hershey Company in 1996.

Products
Amongst Hollywood's confectionery products were:

Butter-Nut (1916) with use of the name successfully defended in a court case challenging the name for use in a chocolate bar
Zero (1920) White coating that did not melt in heat. A silver wrapper with large blue and silver ZERO across the top. Still produced today (2020)
Milkshake  (1927) (similar to a Milky Way bar, but with malt flavor instead of chocolate flavor only)
Pay Day (1932) Caramel nougat coated with whole peanuts. Still produced today (2020) 
Hollywood (dark chocolate coating caramel, nougat and peanuts) 
Big Time (a Milkshake bar with peanuts) Purple wrapper with Big Time written across the top
Red Sails
Smooth Sailin (dark chocolate coating walnut-flavored nougat) A blue wrapper with silver sailboats
747
Almond
Swinger
Buccaneers
Treasure Bar
Nut Sundae Bar
Sno King Candy Bar
Teddy Bear (peanuts, chocolate, nougat)
Nut Patti (almonds, chocolate, nougat)
Tafy Nut / Tofy-Nut
3 Big Bears (three chocolate bars in one)
Top Star (coconut, caramel, nougat)

References

Confectionery companies of the United States
American chocolate companies
Hollywood Candy Company
Companies established in 1912